Rifle is an Italian clothing company founded in 1958 in Prato. It was most famous for their jeans during the 1980s, especially in the USSR, Bulgaria, Poland, and Czechoslovakia. It was also very popular in Switzerland, UK, Israel ,  the Netherlands and  Colombia between 1975 and 1990. There are upscale lines of Rifle Jeans, called Super Rifle, Golden Rifle and Royal Rifle.

External links

 Official site

Clothing brands of Italy
Fashion accessory brands
Rifle
Rifle